Sex Ed is the process of educating people about sex. 

Sex Ed may also refer to:
 "Sex Ed" (song), a song by Heidi Montag
 "Sex Ed", an episode of 8 Simple Rules
 "Sex Ed" (The Office), an episode of The Office
 Sex Ed: The Series, the American comedy web series
 Sex Ed (film), a 2014 American comedy film

See also 
 Sex Education (disambiguation)